(Three motets), Op. 39, is a collection of three sacred motets for women's voices and organ by Felix Mendelssohn. Composed in 1830 for different liturgical occasions and in different scoring, they were published together in 1838.

History 
Mendelssohn composed three motets for women's voices inspired by a visit to Trinità dei Monti, the church at the top of the Spanish Steps in Rome, which he visited in 1830. Having heard the nuns sing there, he wrote to his parents on 20 Dec 1830:  He composed Veni Domine, Laudate pueri and O beata et benedicta the same year. In the three motets published together in 1838, he replaced O beata et benedicta with the more substantial Surrexit pastor bonus.

Structure 
The titles of the three motets, Op. 39, are:
 Veni Domine
 Laudate pueri
 Surrexit pastor bonus

"Veni Domine" (Come, O Lord our God) is a setting of a Latin verse for the Fourth Sunday in Advent. It is a setting in G minor for three voices (SSA) and organ. The duration is about 4 minutes.

"Laudate pueri Dominum" (O ye that serve the Lord) is a setting of two psalm verses, Psalm 113:2 and Psalm 128:1, in Latin. The first verse is set in E-flat major marked Allegro moderato assai, the second in A-flat major marked Adagio. Both are scored for solo and choir voices (SSA) and organ. The motet takes about 6 minutes to perform.

"Surrexit pastor bonus" (The Shepherd blest is risen) is a setting of a Latin hymn for the Sunday of the Good Shepherd. It is based on the reference to Jesus as the Good Shepherd in the Gospel of John (10:12,13,15). Set in G major, it is written in four sections for four solo and choral voices (SSAA) and organ. The final section is an Alleluja building to eight voices. The motet takes about 9 minutes to perform.

Recordings 
The motets were recorded in 2005 by the Kammerchor Stuttgart, conducted by Frieder Bernius, in volume 7 of a complete recording of Mendelssohn's sacred music in 10 volumes. A reviewer noted "the masterly singing of captivating reverence ... from the women of the Stuttgart choir".

References

External links 
 
 
 
 

Motets
Compositions by Felix Mendelssohn
1830 compositions